Tetragonoderus punctatus is a species of beetle in the family Carabidae. It was described by Wiedemann in 1823.

References

punctatus
Beetles described in 1823